Tieleman Vuurman (22 June 1899 – 11 August 1991) was a Dutch sports shooter. He competed in the 50 metre rifle event at the 1936 Summer Olympics.

References

1899 births
1991 deaths
Dutch male sport shooters
Olympic shooters of the Netherlands
Shooters at the 1936 Summer Olympics
Sportspeople from Rotterdam